"Trenches" is a song by American singer Monica and rapper Lil Baby. It was written by both musicians along with Chad Hugo and Pharrell Williams from The Neptunes for Monica's upcoming same-titled ninth studio album, while production was helmed by the latter two. The song was released as the album's first single on August 31, 2020, coinciding with Monica and Brandy's appearances on the webcast battle series Verzuz. "Trenches" has reached number 32 on the US Billboard Digital Song Sales and entered the top 20 on both the Adult R&B Songs and the Hot R&B Songs.

Critical reception
Variety put "Trenches" on their Best Songs of the Week listing. Editor Jem Aswad wrote: "We've gotta say this song snared us when Monica premiered it the other night on her Verzuz battle with Brandy — and while the beat and the Lil Baby cameo are both hot, what's really shining through on this song is the gorgeous melody, which is intricate and tricky to sing, but of course Monica delivers with confidence and ease, dropping in some life lessons along the way."

Chart performance
Upon release, "Trenches" debuted at number 32 on Billboard's Hot 100 component Digital Song Sales, becoming Monica's first entry on the chart since 2008's "Still Standing." The song also opened at number 2 on the R&B Digital Song Sales, number 10 on the R&B/Hip-Hop Digital Song Sales and number 14 on the Hot R&B Songs. It eventually peaked at number 12 on the latter chart. On Billboards Adult R&B Songs, "Trenches" debuted on February 6, 2021. It became her 19 top ten entry on the chart, reaching number 17.

Music video
A music video for "Trenches" was filmed by The Rite Brothers, consisting of director Colin Quinn and first assistant director Sam Green. In the "simplistic visual," Lil Baby portrays a "street heavyweight" with whom Monica catches up in an abandoned warehouse. The video premiered online on November 25, 2020.

Track listing
Digital download
 "Trenches" – 3:35

Charts

Release history

References

External links
Monica.com – official website

2020 singles
2020 songs
Lil Baby songs
Monica (singer) songs
Song recordings produced by the Neptunes
Songs written by Chad Hugo
Songs written by Lil Baby
Songs written by Monica (singer)
Songs written by Pharrell Williams